Maksym Salamakha (born 17 July 1996) is a professional Ukrainian football striker.

Salamakha is the product of the Karpaty Lviv, FC Lviv and FC Metalist School Systems. He played for FC Metalist and FC Dnipro in the Ukrainian Premier League Reserves and Under 19 Championship, but never made a senior team appearances. In July 2016 he signed a three-year contract with his native city's team FC Karpaty. He made his debut for FC Karpaty as a substituted player in the second half of a game against FC Stal Kamianske on 23 July 2016 in the Ukrainian Premier League.

References

External links
 

1996 births
Living people
Ukrainian footballers
FC Karpaty Lviv players
Ukrainian Premier League players
Ukrainian Second League players
Sportspeople from Lviv
Association football forwards
NK Veres Rivne players